Isepamicin (also Isepamycin) is an aminoglycoside antibiotic.

It was patented in 1973 and approved for medical use in 1988. It has been identified by the World Health Organization as a Critically Important Antimicrobial for human use.

References

Aminoglycoside antibiotics